Hell Up in Harlem is a 1973 blaxploitation American neo-noir film, starring Fred Williamson and Gloria Hendry. Written and directed by Larry Cohen, it is a sequel to the film Black Caesar.

The film's soundtrack was recorded by Edwin Starr and released by Motown Records in January 1974.

Plot
Having survived the assassination attempt at the end of Black Caesar, Tommy Gibbs takes on corrupt New York District Attorney DiAngelo, who had sought to jail Gibbs and his father, Papa Gibbs, in order to monopolize the illicit drug trade. Gibbs decides to eliminate drug pushing from the streets of Harlem, while continuing to carry out his other illicit enterprises. Gibbs falls in love with Sister Jennifer (Margaret Avery), a woman who works with Reverend Rufus, a former pimp who has found a religious calling.

Gibbs and his father have a falling out after Gibbs is told by his enforcer, Zach, that his father ordered the death of Gibbs' ex-wife, Helen. Gibbs and Jennifer move to Los Angeles, leaving Papa Gibbs in charge of the Harlem territory. It is later revealed that Zach himself killed Helen as part of a move to take over the territory, with the assistance of DiAngelo. Gibbs defeats hit men sent to take him out in Los Angeles, while Papa dies from a heart attack while fighting Zach.

Knowing that DiAngelo will be having the New York airports and roads watched, Gibbs flies in to Philadelphia, and then enters New York City on foot in order to carry out a personal war against Zach and DiAngelo.

Cast
 Fred Williamson as Tommy Gibbs
 Julius Harris as Papa Gibbs
 Gloria Hendry as Helen Bradley-Washington
 Margaret Avery as Sister Jennifer
 D'Urville Martin as Reverend Rufus
 Tony King as Zach
 Gerald Gordon as DiAngelo
 Bobby Ramsen as Joe Frankfurter
 James Dixon as "Irish" Bryant
 Esther Sutherland as The Cook
 Charles MacGuire as Charles MacGregor

Release on DVD & HD
 In 2001 it was released on DVD.
 In 2010 it was digitized in High Definition (1080i) and broadcast on MGMHD.

See also
 List of American films of 1973

References

External links

 

1973 films
1970s action thriller films
American International Pictures films
Blaxploitation films
Films set in Harlem
Films set in New York City
American independent films
American sequel films
1970s crime action films
American crime action films
Films directed by Larry Cohen
American action thriller films
Films about African-American organized crime
American neo-noir films
1973 drama films
Films with screenplays by Larry Cohen
1970s English-language films
1970s American films